Humboldt High School is a high school (grades 9-12) in Humboldt, Kansas, United States, and operated by Humboldt USD 258 school district. As of the 2014–2015 school year, Humboldt High School has an enrollment of 182 students and has a student-teacher ratio of 91:9.

Academics
Humboldt High School operates on an 7:55 am to 3:25 pm schedule, which includes eight periods. Classes follow traditional scheduling. Although there are eight available periods, students may only take a maximum of seven classes. Students attend the same classes Monday through Friday.

Extracurricular activities
The extracurricular activities offered at Humboldt High School are small and fairly limited due to the school's small size. The Cubs are classified as a 3A school. Throughout its history, Humboldt has won two state championships.

Athletics
The Humboldt Cubs compete in the Tri-Valley League. Humboldt High School offers several sports including football, basketball, baseball, track, volleyball, cross-country, cheerleading, and many more. Due to the small school population, many students are multi-sport athletes.

Basketball
The Cubs boys' basketball team won the state championship in 1969 under Coach Don Walburn.

Football
The Cubs football team was named Tri-Valley League Champions in 2006 and 2007. Humboldt won the Tri-Valley League championship in football in 1968 as well and went undefeated.

Boys' Golf
The boys' golf team won the 2002 state championship at Turkey Creek Golf Course in Burrton, Kansas.

State championships

Non-athletic activities

Scholar's Bowl
The Cubs Scholar's Bowl team won four straight TVL titles from 1998 to 2001, and was the State runner-up in 2001, losing the lead on the last question of the championship round.

Journalism
Humboldt High School's Journalism Department has won 30 Kansas Scholastic Press Association regional journalism championships and 14 state championships (1975, 1979, 1986, 1989, 1990, 1991, 1992, 1995, 1997, 1998, 2000, 2001, 2008, 2009), and has retired two separate traveling trophies by winning three-straight championships in a row twice. Journalism students at HHS have won 61 individual state championships. The school newspaper Cub Tracks has been continually published since 1973. It was inducted into the National Scholastic Press Association's Hall of Fame at that association's Fall Convention in 2000, and won 3rd place in the National Best of Show competition at that same event. Since the All-Kansas Competition began in 1991, Cub Tracks has won a top rating 14 times. The Cub yearbook has also won numerous top ratings from the KSPA.

Notable alumni

 George Sweatt, former baseball player for the Kansas City Monarchs and the Chicago American Giants, the only player in the league to play in all of the first four Negro League World Series while with those two teams

See also
 List of high schools in Kansas
 List of unified school districts in Kansas

References

External links
 Official school website
 Humboldt City Map, KDOT

Schools in Allen County, Kansas
Public high schools in Kansas
2007 establishments in Kansas